Jean-Wilfried Oueifio, known as Willi Oueifio (born 19 January 1984) is a former Central African professional football player and current coach, by Noisiel FC 77.

Coaching career 
He works since 2013 for Noisiel FC 77 as Head coach in the Ligue de Paris Île-de-France de football.

Personal life
His older brothers Ange Oueifio and Mickaël Oueifio are footballers. Willi also holds French citizenship. Oueifio learned during 1987 and 1993 at the Ecole Grande Prairie in Chelles, Seine-et-Marne.

Notes

1984 births
Living people
Central African Republic footballers
Central African Republic expatriate footballers
Expatriate footballers in Scotland
Scottish Premier League players
Heart of Midlothian F.C. players
Expatriate footballers in Switzerland
Expatriate footballers in Hungary
Vác FC players
Kaposvári Rákóczi FC players
Central African Republic football managers

Association football defenders